Joel Cohen is the name of:

Joel Cohen (musician) (born 1942), American musician specializing in early music repertoires
Joel Cohen (writer), American screenwriter
Joel H. Cohen, Canadian TV writer for The Simpsons
Joel Ephraim Cohen (born 1944), American mathematical biologist

See also 
Joel Coen (born 1954), of the Coen brothers
Joel-Cohen incision, a popular technique for performing caesarean section